Harmony is the third album by British-based American R&B/dance group  Londonbeat, released in 1992 (No U.S. release) on the Anxious label.  Although less successful than its predecessor In the Blood, Harmony produced two minor UK hits, "You Bring on the Sun" (#32) and "That's How I Feel About You" (#69).  The former also reached the top 20 in Italy, Sweden, Norway, Switzerland and Austria.

Track listing 
All tracks written by Jimmy Helms, George Chandler, Jimmy Chambers and William Henshall, unless otherwise stated.
 "You Bring on the Sun" – 3:34
 "Lover You Send Me Colours" – 4:17  
 "That's How I Feel About You" – 3:56  
 "Some Lucky Guy" – 4:34  
 "Secret Garden" – 3:58 
 "Give a Gift to Yourself" – 2:48 
 "Harmony" – 7:07 
 "All Born Equal" (Helms, Chandler, Chambers, Henshall, Allen) – 4:03 
 "Rainbow Ride" – 5:09 
 "Keeping the Memories Alive" – 4:17
 "The Sea of Tranquility" – 6:25

Personnel
Credits for Harmony adapted from the CD liner notes.

Londonbeat
Jimmy Chambers  – vocals, additional lead vocals
George Chandler – vocals, additional lead vocals
Jimmy Helms – lead vocals, vocals, flugelhorn, prophet peace piano, muted trumpet
William Henshall – acoustic guitars, electric guitars, trumpet guitar, T3 Saturn pad, T3 synth pad, VS synth pad, marimbas, wavestation majestic strings, prophet hit, J 200 acoustic guitar, synthesised resonance sweep, slide guitars, space guitar effects, Jupiter flute solo, drum machine, VS strings, gossamer guitar fx, Moog bass, prophet strings, sounds of sailing in the Gulf of Mexico
Charles Pierre – drums and percussion, drum machine, funky additional production, Moog bass, pop and whistle keyboards, additional funky vibes, filtered string bass, bazouki bells

Other musicians
Miguel Barradas – steel drums
Kyle Chandler – congas
Dr Horace Dobbs – didgeridoo
Daryl Hall – vocals, lead vocals
Zeb Jameson – M1 piano, P5 summer rain sequence
Luís Jardim – tambourine, shaker, cowbell, maracas, darabuka
Tony Patler – Jupiter bass, acoustic piano
Martyn Phillips – drums, drum machine, tx bass, Akai piano, Moog bass, Moogy sequences, bouncing strings, UV bleeps, glockenspiel, textures, guitar, funky guitar, guitar harmonics, bleeps, bells, bobs, one string picky guitars, FM & Arp sequencers, vs majestic strings, string quartet arrangement, intro mood space, mouth ARP, synthesis, arpeggiator, filtered string bass, muted bridge guitar, Solina string machine, aah pads, hypnotic sequencer, temple bowl
Courtney Pine – sopranino saxophone
Tony Pleeth – cello
Davy Spillane – Uilleann pipes, whistles, Irish whistle
Mick Talbot – C3 organ
Johnny Turnbull – e bow guitar, guitar harmonics
Alan Vosper – dobro guitar
Nathan Watts – bass guitar
Fred Wesley – trombone
Gavin Wright – violin, viola

Production
Produced, engineered and programmed by Martyn Phillips
Production, engineering, programming and mix help from Willy M
Mixed by Bryan 'Chuck' New and Martyn Phillips except for "You Bring on the Sun", mixed by Martyn Phillips, "Rainbow Ride" mixed by Humberto Garcia and "Give a Gift to Yourself" mixed by Martyn Phillips and Willy M

Chart performance

References

Londonbeat albums
1992 albums